The following is a list of characters that first appeared in the BBC soap opera EastEnders in 2015, by order of first appearance. All characters were introduced by the show's executive producer Dominic Treadwell-Collins. January saw the arrival of the year's first baby, Matthew Mitchell Cotton, son of Ronnie Mitchell (Samantha Womack) and Charlie Cotton (Declan Bennett). The following month saw the show celebrate its 30th anniversary with a live week, which oversaw the live arrivals of Vincent Hubbard (Richard Blackwood), and the second baby born in 2015, Pearl Fox-Hubbard, Vincent's daughter with Kim Fox-Hubbard (Tameka Empson). In March, Claudette Hubbard (Ellen Thomas) arrived as Donna Yates' (Lisa Hammond) foster mother and an acquaintance of Les Coker (Roger Sloman) followed by Stan Carter's (Timothy West) friend Cyril Bishop (Andrew Sachs) and Sharon Mitchell's aunt Margaret Midhurst (Jan Harvey), whilst Denise van Outen joined in April as Karin Smart. May saw the arrivals of June Whitfield as Sister Ruth, Mick (Danny Dyer) and Linda Carter's (Kellie Bright) son Ollie Carter, the year's third baby, Mo Harris' (Laila Morse) business associate Fat Elvis and Kush Kazemi's (Davood Ghadami) mother, Carmel (Bonnie Langford). Paul Coker (Jonny Labey), the grandson of Les and Pam Coker (Lin Blakley), was introduced in June, as was Jade Green (Amaya Edward), the long-lost daughter of Shabnam Masood (Rakhee Thakrar) and Dean Wicks (Matt Di Angelo). After Kathy Sullivan's (Gillian Taylforth) surprise return during the 30th anniversary in February, her husband Gavin Sullivan (Paul Nicholas) made his debut in August. September saw the arrivals of Max Branning's (Jake Wood) prosecution lawyer Hazel Warren (Clare Higgins) and Louie Beale, the baby son of Lauren Branning (Jacqueline Jossa) and Peter Beale (Ben Hardy). In October, Elaine Peacock's (Maria Friedman) toyboy lover Jason Adams (Scott Neal) was introduced, as well as first transgender character to be played by a transgender actor, Kyle Slater (Riley Carter Millington). December saw the birth of the year's fifth baby, Kush and Stacey Branning's (Lacey Turner) son, Arthur Fowler. Additionally, multiple other characters appeared throughout the year.

Matthew Mitchell Cotton

Matthew Mitchell Cotton, portrayed by Zack Karbritz, is the son of Charlie Cotton (Declan Bennett) and Ronnie Mitchell (Samantha Womack). He is born during the episode broadcast on 1 January 2015 on his parents' wedding day.

Matthew is born after Ronnie is involved in a car accident. She is later placed in a coma, due to her injuries. Her sister, Roxy Mitchell (Rita Simons) and her boyfriend Aleks Shirovs (Kristian Kiehling) look after Matthew when Charlie refuses to see him, due to Ronnie's absence. Charlie's father, Nick Cotton (John Altman), takes Matthew from Roxy, attempting to force Charlie to see his son but Charlie refuses and gives him back to Roxy. Aleks suggests naming him Matthew after Nick's mother Dot Branning (June Brown) quotes from the Gospel of Matthew. Aleks's daughter Ineta Shirovs (Gledisa Arthur) becomes fed up with Aleks looking after Matthew and takes him to the bus stop, so they can go to the hospital. Charlie finds them and takes Matthew home. He and Roxy then share residency until Ronnie is discharged from hospital.

When Matthew is nine months old, he stays with Ronnie when she and Charlie separate, although Charlie vows to fight for custody. When Charlie tells Roxy he wants to take Matthew to France, she tells Ronnie. Roxy goes with Charlie but he soon realises that Ronnie and Roxy are working together when he sees Roxy constantly looking at her phone and Fatboy tells him that Vincent has told Ronnie, so he decides to leave with Matthew alone. However, Ronnie arrives before Charlie can board his train, and convinces him not to make the same mistakes as Nick did. Charlie leaves Matthew with Ronnie. Four days later, Charlie returns to Walford, having been persuaded by Dot to fight for custody, but Ronnie turns nasty when Charlie threatens to tell the police that she murdered Carl White (Daniel Coonan) and says that she will never see Matthew again. She and former boyfriend, Vincent Hubbard (Richard Blackwood), confront Charlie, who, in fear of his life, disappears. Matthew lives with Ronnie and her ex-husband, Jack Branning (Scott Maslen), when they reunite in March 2016 and Jack and Roxy's daughter, Amy Mitchell (Abbie Knowles) later moves in. Matthew is nearly hit by a car when Hannah Reynolds (Mia Jenkins) steps into the road whilst holding him, but is saved by Andy Flynn (Jack Derges), who pushes them out of the way of the approaching car.

On the night that Ronnie and Jack remarry on New Year's Day 2017, Ronnie and Roxy both die after drowning in the hotel swimming pool, leaving Matthew in Jack and his maternal grandmother Glenda Mitchell's (Glynis Barber) care when she moves in to help bring up the children. Glenda, Amy, Matthew and Jack's son Ricky Mitchell (Henri Charles) grow close but eventually she realises she is not what Jack, Amy, Ricky and Matthew need to get through Ronnie and Roxy's deaths so decides to leave Walford, while promising to remain a part of Amy and Matthew's lives. After taking Matthew to the garden centre in February 2017, Dot has an accident in her car due to her eye sight. She and Matthew are unharmed and taken home by the police. When Matthew goes missing, Jack's brother, Max Branning (Jake Wood), tells Jack that Matthew is at Dot's and when Jack goes to get him, Charlie answers the door, telling Jack they need to talk about Matthew. Jack reluctantly lets Charlie spend time with and look after Charlie. Charlie tells Dot that he has seen a solicitor about Matthew, who he plans to take back to Ireland with him. Dot tells Jack that Charlie is going to take Matthew back to Ireland and Charlie and Jack argue about it, with Jack later telling Charlie that he swore on Ronnie's grave to never leave Amy, Ricky and Matthew. When Charlie provokes Jack by saying Ronnie deserved to die, Jack punches him and Max tells Jack he may have lost his chances of keeping Matthew. Max learns that Jack still may get to keep Matthew despite the fight with Jack, so Max visits Charlie and beats him up to make it look like Jack did it. In April 2017, Jack is arrested and charged with assault. Dot attempts to mediate between Charlie and Jack, but they fail to come up with any solution and Jack plans to go on the run with Amy, Ricky and Matthew, but Dot tells Max and they talk him out of it. Charlie watches Honey Mitchell (Emma Barton) in the park with Amy, Ricky, Matthew and her children, Janet (Grace) and Will Mitchell (Freddie Phillips). Honey tells Charlie what a good father Jack is and Charlie informs Jack he has notified social services about applying for residency. Stacey Fowler (Lacey Turner) tells Jack he has to work things out with Charlie. Charlie's wife, Liz Cotton (Michelle Connolly) arrives in Albert Square in place of Charlie and tells Jack about her job and family, trying to assure him that Matthew would have a good life and that Amy and Ricky would be welcome to visit. Jack phones Liz to arrange a visit and agree rules for Matthew, letting Charlie have residency. Jack and Dot are heartbroken when Matthew leaves with Charlie and Liz.

Charlie and Matthew return in December 2017 and Charlie explains to Jack the reason for their return is that Matthew refers to Jack as "dad". Charlie also tells Jack that he just wanted contact and that having Matthew full-time was not part of the "plan", so Jack demands to know what the plan was. Charlie tells Jack that Max set him up. After initially denying it, Max admits that he was responsible for Matthew being taken away as payback and Jack throws Max out.

Reporters for the Daily Mirror called Matthew an "unfortunate boy".

Vincent Hubbard

Vincent Hubbard, played by Richard Blackwood, made his first screen appearance on 17 February 2015. The character and casting was announced on 17 January 2015. Blackwood praised bosses for the character of Vincent, stating he knew that his portrayal would surprise viewers given his comedy background. He is described on the BBC website as: 'a smooth operator, whose easy charm and quick wittedness covers a steely, ruthless streak and a reputation as a bit of a bad boy.' The BBC then go on to also state that Vincent 'believes himself to be the "main man" in the room, and knows how to play people to his advantage.'

Pearl Fox

Pearl Fox (also Fox-Hubbard), played by Arayah Harris-Buckle, is the daughter of Kim Fox-Hubbard (Tameka Empson) and Vincent Hubbard (Richard Blackwood). She was born during the live episode broadcast on 19 February 2015 during the show's 30th anniversary celebrations.

Pearl is born in the ladies' toilets of The Queen Victoria public house after Kim goes into labour two months early. She is placed in intensive care following her birth and Kim is told that she has an infection. A week later, Kim has Pearl christened with the middle names Denise and Patrice, named after her sister Denise Fox (Diane Parish), and Denise's surrogate father Patrick Trueman (Rudolph Walker) respectively, and is told that she has recovered from her infection. In March 2015, Kim is able to bring Pearl home to Albert Square. Eventually, Kim and Vincent reunite and Vincent moves in so he can become a proper father to Pearl. Kim and Vincent enter her in a baby contest, which she wins after Vincent pays the competition manager. As Vincent's feud with Phil Mitchell (Steve McFadden) escalates in December 2015, Phil kidnaps Pearl while she is being looked after by Vincent's foster sister Donna Yates (Lisa Hammond), but is safely being looked after by Honey Mitchell (Emma Barton).

Gary Gillatt from Inside Soap observed that Pearl's name was his favourite "subtle touch" for the show's birthday celebrations, as Pearl is the gift traditionally given on a 30th anniversary. While Heat's Kay Ribeiro was disappointed that Kim did not name her after Queen Victoria, considering where she was born. Ribeiro also thought that Kim would have chosen "something suitably flashy and fabulous but chose the surprisingly demure name, Pearl. Oh well, each to their own." Katy Brent from the Daily Mirror commented "You'd think that being born in Albert Square, in the Vic, on the 30th anniversary of the show, would be a good omen for any baby. Sadly, that doesn't seem to be the case for baby Pearl, whose little life is hanging in the balance." Brent hoped Pearl would come through her illness, so there would be a happy outcome for a change.

Claudette Hubbard

Claudette Hubbard, played by Ellen Thomas, made her first screen appearance on 12 March 2015. Thomas' casting was announced on 1 March 2015. The role of Claudette marks Thomas' fourth time on EastEnders, she previously appeared as Pearl Chadwick (1990), Estella Hulton in 2002 and Grace Olubunmi (2010–2011). Of Thomas and her character, executive producer Dominic Treadwell-Collins commented "Ellen Thomas belongs on EastEnders. Albert Square now has a new steely matriarch – with a few twisted secrets hidden behind her beaming smile." David Brown from the Radio Times added that Claudette had links to established regular characters and would be "a tough-talking resident of Albert Square". Thomas revealed that Claudette's family would be introduced to the square, saying: "Claudette is a foster mother, she's fostered children for the last 30 years. She's fostered the kind of children nobody else wants – tough cookies." She stated that it was a "brilliant opportunity to bring new characters in". Laura-Jane Tyler from Inside Soap admitted to being a little scared by "steely" Claudette and said she made Vincent "look like a pussycat." Tyler also hoped that Claudette would turn out to be a big crime boss. On 13 September 2016, it was confirmed that Ellen Thomas would depart as Claudette and would leave the show in the coming weeks after being axed by the new executive producer, Sean O'Connor.

Storylines

Claudette is shown to be having what looks like an affair with Les Coker (Roger Sloman) when he visits her at a café and gives her a necklace. Later that night, while he and his wife, Pam Coker (Lin Blakley), are celebrating their wedding anniversary, Les gets a text from Claudette, thanking him for her necklace. Claudette and Les meet again a week later at the park, with Claudette later arriving for her foster daughter Donna Yates' (Lisa Hammond) birthday celebrations as arranged by Pam. It is revealed that she knows Les and Pam from when the latter worked as a social worker and placed Donna in Claudette's care. Weeks later, it is revealed that both Claudette and Les are in Gran Canaria on business. Donna ironically suggests that the two should meet up. Claudette reappears when her son Vincent Hubbard (Richard Blackwood) introduces her to her new granddaughter Pearl, and his wife Kim Fox-Hubbard (Tameka Empson). Claudette is angry that she had to wait so long to meet Pearl. She is hostile towards Kim, her sister Denise Fox (Diane Parish) and their family friend Patrick Trueman (Rudolph Walker), as she believes that they have stolen Vincent from her. When Les' grandson, Paul Coker (Jonny Labey), arrives in Walford, he reveals that he knows Les and Claudette are having an affair. Les decides to stop meeting Claudette but she is not willing to conclude it and states that she will make it difficult for him to exit.

When Paul tells Vincent that Claudette and Les are having an affair, Vincent confronts her about it after finding identical postcards from Gran Canaria in both her and Les's houses, but agrees not to say anything to Pam. Les attempts to dissuade Claudette from coming to the Coker and Sons centenary party but she goes anyway and tells Les that Vincent is aware of their meetings. Meanwhile, at home, Paul tells Pam about the affair. Claudette later realises that Pam knows while seeing her freak out at her face with her and Les in the newspaper photo. She makes plans to have dinner with Les, declining Pam's invitation to dinner on the way there. When Pam notes how Claudette used exactly the same words as Les did, Claudette sends Les home. He accidentally leaves his tie at her house. Claudette, who knows the Mitchells, finds Vincent has been beaten by Phil Mitchell (Steve McFadden) and vows revenge on Phil. When Pam visits Claudette, she finds Les's tie, but after he and Claudette give conflicting explanations on this, Pam leaves to stay with her sister. Les becomes very distraught at her departure, and Claudette urges him to tell Pam the truth, just as Pam returns and walks in on them together. Shortly after Claudette leaves the house, Pam urges Les to end the affair or their marriage is over. Two months later, Les visits Claudette for comfort after Pam refuses to speak to him on their deceased son's birthday. Two days later, he calls Claudette, telling her he cannot stop thinking about her, and later makes an excuse to Pam to go and be with Claudette again. He is then caught at Claudette's house in his underwear by Donna, who concludes they are having an affair, though Claudette tries to explain it is not what she thinks. Donna tells Pam, who goes to Claudette's house and sets about destroying gifts from Les until Claudette says the presents are not hers, and Pam should ask Les about Christine. When Pam asks Les, he reveals that Christine is his secret feminine alter ego, and he likes wearing women's clothes, and that Claudette has been supporting this secret. Claudette later tells Pam that Les persuaded her not to reveal his secret and encourages Pam to speak to Les about it. The next day, she helps Pam and Les prepare for their "meeting" with Christine, and tells Pam that "seeing" Christine for the first time will be easier than she thinks. Claudette is later annoyed when Vincent has sex with a married Ronnie Mitchell (Samantha Womack), whom he had dated before, and advises them to work on their own marriages. She moves in with Vincent, Kim and Pearl when he buys a large house on Albert Square.

Claudette starts working in The Albert and meets Phil's aunt, Sal (Anna Karen), who is visiting the Mitchells. Sal reveals that Claudette used to work at a bar nearby and has known the Mitchell family for decades. Sal threatens to reveal secrets about Claudette, so she asks Vincent to speed up with his plan to take down the Mitchells. It is revealed that Claudette's husband, Henry, was an associate of Den Watts (Leslie Grantham), Ted Hills (Brian Croucher), Gavin Sullivan (Paul Nicholas) and Eric Mitchell (George Russo), Phil's father. Vincent was told by Claudette that Henry was killed by Eric 34 years previously on Christmas Eve after a confrontation when Vincent was a child. A drunken Phil kidnaps Pearl which leads to an altercation between Vincent and Phil. Vincent says that Eric killed his father but Phil says Henry just left Walford. The feud between the Mitchells and Hubbards leads to the death of innocent Fatboy (Ricky Norwood), so Vincent tells Claudette that their feud killed him and they should end it, but this infuriates Claudette who then compares him to his father and accidentally lets slip that Henry did not die when she said he did. When Ronnie's mother Glenda Mitchell (Glynis Barber) makes a brief visit, she recognises Claudette and Vincent, and later tells Ronnie that Eric did not kill Henry because he was drunk that night and did not leave the house. Ronnie then blackmails Claudette with the information, so Claudette tells Vincent to end the feud as it cannot bring back Henry or Fatboy. Claudette and Patrick flirt with each other and eventually begin dating; however it is hampered by Denise's disapproval.

Claudette and Kim's rivalry intensifies at Pearl's first birthday party, and when Claudette's foster son Linford Short (Leon Lopez) announces that he and Vincent have entered Claudette into the Pride of Walford Awards and she is a finalist, a jealous Kim jumps on Pearl's bouncy castle in an attempt to take attention from Claudette, which Claudette punctures in retaliation. Later that day, Gavin meets Claudette and blackmails her, saying he wants money to stop him revealing a secret from her past. She fails to get money from Les or Vincent, so she meets Gavin at her home and tries to pay him off with sex. However, he says that it is worthless as she used to be promiscuous, and asks how she killed Henry, so Claudette strikes him over the head with a candelabra. Vincent then arrives, and she lies about the circumstances, but when Gavin escapes, her lies are revealed and Vincent works out he was blackmailing her and she killed Henry. When she insults Henry, Vincent chokes Claudette, as Patrick arrives and stops him. Vincent reveals to Patrick that Claudette killed Henry, and as Patrick tries to call the police, Claudette tries to snatch the phone off him, but falls down the basement stairs, hitting her head on a brick. Patrick leaves to get help but when he returns, Vincent has buried Claudette underneath the basement and tells Patrick to forget it happened or they will both be arrested for murder. However, unknown to Vincent and Patrick, Claudette escapes from the basement and is brought into the hospital by paramedics after she was found by the side of a road. Patrick later sees Claudette. Realising that she is alive, he tells Vincent, who soon realises the truth. When Vincent goes to Donna's home, Donna reveals Claudette is with her and has told her what Vincent did to her. Donna refuses to believe that Claudette killed Henry, so Vincent reveals that Claudette killed Fatboy. Donna is distraught at being lied to and asks Vincent and Claudette to leave, but Patrick arrives and confirms that Claudette killed Henry. Claudette insists Henry's death was an accident and threatens to show the police her neck bruises if Patrick calls the police on her, but Donna sees past this, saying that Claudette's fostering her was just an attempt to lessen Claudette's guilt. Vincent tells Claudette to leave Walford for good or he will tell Gavin where she is. Claudette visits Pearl privately and says goodbye to her, promising that she will come back soon.

At the Pride of Walford Awards a few months later, Donna accepts an award on her mum's behalf saying how she was not alone when Claudette took her in but now she is alone again. However, Claudette secretly watches behind the door but decides not to come in. Claudette tries to visit Donna in Bridge Street Market but notices her former enemy Peggy Mitchell (Barbara Windsor) who scowls at her, so Claudette walks away. Claudette supports Les and Pam when their grandson, Paul, dies following a homophobic attack and she learns that Babe Smith (Annette Badland) has been blackmailing them over Les' cross-dressing. Claudette threatens Babe, and their argument is witnessed by Babe's relative Linda Carter (Kellie Bright). When Babe is locked in The Queen Victoria public house's freezer store, Linda accuses Claudette, but Patrick states she was with him, revealing their relationship to Vincent and Donna. However, when Patrick states that Claudette left the house at about the time Babe was attacked, she ends their relationship, saying he does not trust her. Claudette also exposes Babe's blackmail to Linda and her husband Mick Carter (Danny Dyer). It transpires that the real culprit is Abi Branning (Lorna Fitzgerald). She later briefly reconciles with Patrick but her jealousy over his closeness with Dot Branning (June Brown) causes him to publicly break up with her. Humiliated and enraged, she asks Vincent to "take care" of Patrick for hurting her but he and Donna make her see the error of her ways and encourage her to stay with Linford to clear her head. On her way out of Walford, she meets Patrick and tells him he was never good enough for her but Patrick says that Claudette does not think she is good enough for anyone.

Cyril Bishop

Cyril Bishop, played by Andrew Sachs, appears on 18 and 19 March 2015. He is a cancer patient who Stan Carter (Timothy West) befriends when he is admitted to hospital. Cyril is in a bed on the same ward as Stan. He is visited by his family, which Stan witnesses, having told his own family not to come and see him. He talks to Stan about his love of Carry On films and they share their thoughts on their situations. Their relationship turns sour when Stan realises that his family do not care for him like Cyril's family do. Later in the day, Cyril dies during an argument between Babe Smith (Annette Badland) and Cora Cross (Ann Mitchell).

Sachs' role as Stan's hospital roommate was revealed on 10 March 2015, when it was said he would be part of Stan's exit storyline. Duncan Lindsay from the Metro said, "Stan becomes infuriated by Cyril's presence but something tells us that before the inevitable heartbreaking finale of the tale, the pair could become good friends a la Morgan Freeman and Jack Nicholson in The Bucket List", and said that Sachs' appearance in the show is "a treat for viewers".

Margaret Midhurst

Margaret Midhurst, played by Jan Harvey, appears in nine episodes between 24 March 2015 and 8 July 2016.

Margaret is the solicitor who handled Sharon Mitchell's (Letitia Dean) adoption. Sharon visits Margaret in a bid to find her biological father. Margaret tells Sharon that all the paperwork in connection with her case had been destroyed. She later visits Sharon at home after Sharon calls her, and asks Margaret if her adoptive father, Den Watts (Leslie Grantham), was her biological father, fearing that her son Dennis Rickman (Harry Hickles/Bleu Landau) could be a product of incest. Margaret assures Sharon that Den was not her biological father but reveals that Den had not wanted the adoption discussed at The Queen Victoria public house, making Sharon conclude that her biological father was someone Den knew. Sharon later arranges for Carol Jackson (Lindsey Coulson) to meet Margaret and she offers to represent Carol's brother Max Branning (Jake Wood) when he is charged with the murder of Lucy Beale (Hetti Bywater) (see Who Killed Lucy Beale?). Before Margaret goes to the prison to meet Max, Sharon informs her she has decided not to find her father, insisting that she needs to move on from her past. When Carol starts to believe Max is guilty, she relieves Margaret of her duties. Sharon offers to pay her for her services and Margaret reveals that she will inform Max that she is dropping the case and that he needs to find another lawyer to represent him. when Sharon visits Margaret to file for divorce from Phil, it is clear that Margaret is covering for someone when the police arrive at her offices. It later emerges that Margaret is Gavin Sullivan's (Paul Nicholas) sister, and Gavin is Sharon's birth father, making Margaret Sharon's aunt, and Gavin asked Margaret to make sure Sharon did not find out, after she told him that Sharon was trying to find him.

After Gavin gets money from Vincent Hubbard (Richard Blackwood) after attempting to blackmail his mother Claudette Hubbard (Ellen Thomas), a former associate of Gavin's, and from Sharon, who wants him to leave Walford forever, he meets Margaret and it is revealed she is in on his plan, but is against his next plan, which she calls "insane". Several months later, Margaret visits Sharon and tells her that Gavin is acting strangely, but Sharon dismisses it and sends Margaret away. Later, Margaret arrives at Gavin's house, where he has brought his wife, Kathy (Gillian Taylforth) under false pretenses. Gavin locks Kathy in a room while Margaret questions Gavin's motives as Kathy now knows where he lives and she fears she will also be implicated in Gavin's crimes, however, Gavin tells her that Kathy will not be leaving. Margaret rescues Kathy from the room after hitting Gavin over the head with a vase, however, he regains consciousness and the two women try to hide from him. Sharon and Buster Briggs (Karl Howman) arrive, having seen Kathy leaving Walford with Gavin and got the address from Dennis, and then a woman falls onto the windscreen of their car and breaking her neck and is killed instantly. They see that it is Margaret who fell to her death from a balcony after a struggle with Gavin.

Development and reception
Harvey's casting was announced at the same time as that of June Whitfield in the role of Sister Ruth, on 5 March 2015. Harvey said of her initial filming, "I loved working on such an iconic show. Everyone was so welcoming. EastEnders is really like one big family." Executive producer Dominic Treadwell-Collins said, "We are extremely privileged to have two British television legends joining us for guest roles as Albert Square heads into the spring. Both June and Jan are class acts, bringing warmth and humanity to two characters who will shed some light on the pasts of two of our most iconic women—Sharon Mitchell and Kat Moon (Jessie Wallace)—changing both their lives in very different ways."

Inside Soap called Margaret "wicked" and hoped to see more of her, saying "what could be more fun than Sharon having an evil auntie?"

Karin Smart

Karin Smart, played by Denise van Outen, made her first screen appearance on 9 April 2015. Van Outen's casting was announced on 2 February 2015. Of her casting, she stated "I'm really excited to be joining EastEnders, as I've been a fan of the series for years. 2015 marks the show's 30th anniversary, so it feels even more special to be part of this year's celebration." Van Outen described Karin as manipulative, cheeky and mischievous and revealed that her character would "cause chaos for two men", adding that "it won't just be the men who Karin is winding up – the women of Walford won't like her either." Karin arrived in Albert Square for two episodes on 9 and 10 April, looking for Phil Mitchell (Steve McFadden). She then returned for a further two episodes from 27 April.

Max Branning (Jake Wood) is impressed by Karin when she approaches him asking for the whereabouts of Phil, and Jay Brown (Jamie Borthwick) warns him that Karin's deceased husband was involved in a dodgy business. Max dismisses Jay and goes on to form a deal with Karin at the car lot, and the two later end up having sex, though it is implied that Phil had meant this to happen. The following morning, Karin visits Phil and he pays her a large sum of money; she leaves. Jay later reveals to Max that the cars Karin has supplied him with are stolen, so Max orders Karin to return and collect them. However, he changes his mind after a conversation between him and his sister, Carol Jackson (Lindsey Coulson). Karin returns to tell Max that the police have begun seizing the cars and that some have drugs in them. She tells Max to dump the cars and then takes his clothes to stop the police tracing his involvement. Phil agrees to help Max on the condition he sign over all of his businesses to Phil. After Max does so, Phil and Karin tell Max they made the whole story up to con him out of his businesses. Karin collects her final payment. She assures Max it was not personal, tells him "Karin Smart" is not her real name and leaves.

Sister Ruth

Sister Ruth, played by June Whitfield, appears in three episodes on 1 May 2015, and 5 and 6 January 2016. Ruth is a nun at a care home for nuns that had previously been the nunnery where Kat Moon (Jessie Wallace) gave birth to her daughter Zoe Slater (Michelle Ryan) 31 years previously. Kat wants closure as Zoe was the product of rape by her uncle Harry Slater (Michael Elphick). Ruth was present at the birth and remembers it in detail. She and Kat discuss things and Ruth helps Kat to move on with her life. After Kat leaves, Ruth and Sister Judith (Sandy McDade) look at the birth record, seeing that Kat gave birth to twins, Zoe and a boy. When Kat returns from Spain after winning the lottery, she agrees to make a charitable donation to the convent. Judith arrives in Walford and finds Kat, telling her that Ruth could not come as she is unwell. Kat sees Ruth arrive later, so invites her into her house, and Ruth tells her the full truth about what happened at the convent. She reveals that Kat passed out before giving birth to the boy, and that her mother Viv Slater ordered that he be taken away from her, so he was adopted by a family in Ireland shortly after. Ruth then relays her experiences of losing her children to an airstrike in World War II. Ruth then reveals to Kat that Viv telephoned someone that night who must have known about the son, and Kat discovers that it was her grandmother Mo Harris (Laila Morse).

Whitfield's casting was announced at the same time as that of Jan Harvey in the role of Margaret Midhurst, on 5 March 2015. Whitfield was originally announced to be appearing in a single episode. She said of her initial filming, "I have watched EastEnders for years, and have been so impressed by the standard of acting. It was an absolute delight to work with Jessie Wallace and I am very excited to be part of the show." Executive producer Dominic Treadwell-Collins said, "We are extremely privileged to have two British television legends joining us for guest roles as Albert Square heads into the spring. Both June and Jan are class acts, bringing warmth and humanity to two characters who will shed some light on the pasts of two of our most iconic women—Sharon Mitchell (Letitia Dean) and Kat Moon—changing both their lives in very different ways." In July 2016, Whitfield said she thought Ruth was the first time she had played a nun, and when asked if she could return to EastEnders, said she thought that Ruth had since died because her ill health was mentioned in the show. Digital Spy writer Charlotte Whistlecroft said, "it would make sense given how desperate Ruth was to tell Kat the truth about her secret son."

Ollie Carter

Oliver "Ollie" Carter is the youngest son of Linda Carter (Kellie Bright) and Mick Carter (Danny Dyer), born prematurely on 12 May 2015 after Linda experiences a fall down the stairs. Ollie is originally portrayed by a child called Jack Tilley until 2016, after which he is portrayed by a child called Charlie Harrington. Since 2017, Harry Farr has played Ollie. Of the character's paternity, Laura-Jayne Tyler from Inside Soap commented "We knew, even at first sight, that EastEnders adorable ickle new Carter couldn't have sprung from anyone as vile as Dean."

Linda falls pregnant with Ollie shortly after being raped by Mick's brother Dean Wicks (Matt Di Angelo). Concerned about the baby's paternity after the baby is born, Mick does a test which confirms that he and Linda both share the same blood group as Ollie. Mick tells Dean that his blood group does not match, and is happy to discover that he is the father. Linda names Ollie after Oliver Twist, from the musical of the same name. He is brought home by Mick and Linda. Following a fight between his older sister Nancy Carter (Maddy Hill) and his older brother Lee Carter (Danny Hatchard), Ollie is knocked out of his highchair, with Lee's girlfriend Whitney Dean (Shona McGarty) alerting Mick and Linda. He appears to be fine, despite Mick insisting they should take him to hospital. Linda later finds Ollie is not breathing, but successfully resuscitates him. He then suffers a seizure and is admitted to hospital where a doctor tells the Carters that Ollie has bleeding on his brain caused by a blow to the head, that Ollie could have brain damage, and that children's services must be informed. Mick blames Nancy, which causes tension in the family. Eventually, Mick realises Nancy is sorry and that she is not to blame and the family reconcile. Mick and Linda worry that Ollie does not respond in the way they expect and are frustrated by the lack of treatment as they have to wait to see the extent of the damage. After a heist involving Mick, he is suspected of stealing the money and Aidan Maguire (Patrick Bergin) frightens Linda when he lets himself into The Queen Vic when he has hold of Ollie. The Carters panic when Ollie and the pub is covered in petrol.

Fat Elvis

Fat Elvis, played by Shenton Dixon, is a long-term business associate and love-interest of Mo Harris (Laila Morse). The character has been mentioned several times since 2004. He is usually mentioned when supplying Mo with dodgy goods to sell, or when the characters are involved in romance.  Fat Elvis appears on 22 May 2015, after Mo reveals he has proposed marriage to her and she has accepted. However, several months later, Mo reveals that Fat Elvis has left her for his probation officer.

It was announced that his appearance would only be a one off for the time being, albeit with the option of additional appearances in the future. A source at EastEnders said, "Everyone on the show was really excited to finally put a face to the name of Fat Elvis. It's a one-off appearance for now, but who knows what could happen in the future..." ITV News called Fat Elvis a "cult character" and said that fans went "into meltdown" after his unannounced appearance in the show. The Daily Mirror said Fat Elvis's appearance was "a long, long, long time coming" and called the character "mysterious".

Carmel Kazemi

Carmel Kazemi, played by Bonnie Langford, made her first screen appearance on 26 May 2015. The character and Langford's casting was announced on 5 April 2015. The actress began filming her first scenes in the same month. Of her casting, Langford said "I'm so thrilled and delighted to be part of EastEnders. I'm a great fan of the show and think the recent 30th Anniversary was sensational and shows just how good British television can be. To be part of this family is an absolute privilege." Carmel is Kush Kazemi's (Davood Ghadami) mother. Executive producer Dominic Treadwell-Collins described the character as being a loud and embarrassing "modern Essex divorcée who isn't quite ready to cut the apron strings". He added that she would clash with Kush's fiancée Shabnam Masood (Rakhee Thakrar). Laura-Jane Tyler from Inside Soap praised Langford's first appearance and said "bright, bubbly and a touch inappropriate, Carmel has an air of Peggy Mitchell about her – but not half as irritating! More please EastEnders!" It was announced in August 2015 that Langford had signed a one-year contract with the show and that Carmel would become a regular character. Langford revealed her delight at this news. Laura-Jayne Tyler of Inside Soap was pleased with the news Carmel would be a regular character, "The shiny new plaque on Bonnie Langford's dressing room door suggest that Carmel is set for a long stay on the Square. We couldn't be happier!" It was announced on 12 July 2018 that Langford would be leaving the role at the end of the year. Carmel departed on 5 November 2018.

Carmel comes for dinner with Shabnam after she becomes engaged to Kush. She gets on well with her father, Masood Ahmed (Nitin Ganatra), and they go for a drink together, where Masood tells Carmel that Shabnam has a daughter that she abandoned seven years ago. Carmel is understanding and offers her support to Shabnam but this just angers Shabnam as it wasn't his place to tell anyone. Carmel visits frequently and Shabnam dislikes her interference with planning the wedding. She is delighted when Shabnam and Kush announce they are expecting. Carmel visits unannounced, distraught that Kush's father is selling her house and Shabnam begrudgingly allows her to stay with them but catches her in bed with Masood. After Kush learns that the baby is dead, Masood contacts Carmel and allows her to stay with him. Before returning to Essex, she and Masood help Kush and Shabnam reconcile for their stillborn son, Zaair's, funeral. Carmel returns in November for the wedding and before they leave for their honeymoon, she promises to run Kush's stall in his absence. She also befriends Denise Fox (Diane Parish).

Shortly after Kush and Shabnam return, Carmel sees Kush and a pregnant Stacey Branning (Lacey Turner) whispering and, after talking to Stacey, she realizes that Kush could be the baby's father. She confronts them but they persuade her not to tell Shabnam or Martin Fowler (James Bye), insisting it is not the right time. Carmel agrees, but warns Stacey that Kush may want access to the baby if it is his.

Carmel returns to the square in the spring, saying that her former husband, Umar Kazemi (Selva Rasalingam), is selling her house after all and that she has nowhere to live, so Kush allows her to move in with him and is joined by her youngest son, Shakil (Shaheen Jafargholi) a few weeks later. Shakil tells her that Umar wants to meet to discuss a possible reunion but it turns out that Shakil was lying, making Carmel feel unwanted but she and Shakil soon make up. Carmel is encouraged to apply for the job of market Inspector by Denise, and is overjoyed when she gets the job. She gets on the traders' nerves initially but soon learns to work with them. Carmel begins sleeping with Masood and she hopes that it will lead to a relationship but Masood leaves to travel the world, leaving Carmel devastated. She is later shocked to discover Denise is pregnant, telling her to book a scan and pressures her to tell her who the father is, infuriating Denise as the baby's father is Phil Mitchell (Steve McFadden). When she feels her flat is too crowded, she decides to rent No. 31 after Sonia Fowler (Natalie Cassidy) leaves the square. However, Martin opposes her as he wants the house for his family, so Carmel retracts her deposit and decides to rent No. 41, Masood's house instead. Whilst moving in, Masood returns unexpectedly, forcing them to share the house as she has already signed the contract. When Belinda Peacock (Carli Norris) begins a relationship with Masood, she doubts her motives and accuses her of only being with Masood for financial purposes, to save her debt ridden salon, "Elysium". However, Belinda leaves the square soon after. Carmel and Denise are later furious to discover that Masood is planning to move to Pakistan and accuses him of leaving to reunite with his former wife Zainab Masood (Nina Wadia). They all reconciled before Masood leaves, telling him they'll always be there for him, and watch him leave. Carmel tries to talk Denise out of her decision to give her newborn son up for adoption, but eventually decides to support her, not wanting to end their friendship. Carmel tries to reason with market traders when they hear that the market be relocated. During the dispute, a bus crashes into the market and the viaduct. Carmel survives the crash and worries over Shakil's welfare when she learns he is on board, but is later relieved when he jumps off the top deck safely with the help of the others at the bottom.

Carmel is shocked to discover that naked photos of Shakil have been sent around the school, and is angry to discover it was allegedly Shakil's former girlfriend, Bex Fowler (Jasmine Armfield) who sent them, although it was really Louise Mitchell (Tilly Keeper). Due to the tension between the Kazemis and the Fowlers, Martin and Stacey decide that Carmel should keep her distance from her grandson, which Carmel reacts badly to, and in the argument, she and Stacey physically fight after Carmel made a comment on Stacey's mental health. In April 2017, she becomes close to Max Branning (Jake Wood), after he helps her make amends with Stacey, and also helps her with an interview for the Walford Council planning committee. Although she remains oblivious to Max's scheming. When Masood returns from travelling, he informs Carmel that he is not going to renew her tenancy contract. Although disappointed, Carmel asks Max whether they should find a home of their own, which slightly displeases him. Carmel is then delighted that the council has dropped the investigation and decides to make her a full-time employee. Shortly after having sex with Max, Carmel finds an engagement ring while tidying up the house and mistakenly believes Max wants to propose to her, when in fact it is intended for his secret girlfriend Fi Browning (Lisa Faulkner). The following day Carmel still believes Max is going to propose to her and prepares to celebrate with him at The Queen Vic. However, when he walks into The Queen Vic, he deliberately ignores her and kisses Fi, humiliating Carmel in front of everyone and finally revealing his scheme. Realising she has been used, Carmel upsettingly storms out of the pub. Carmel and Shakil then moves in with Kush and Denise. While Carmel is at Windsor for the wedding of Prince Harry and Meghan Markle, Shakil is stabbed by a gang and the delay in finding him proves fatal. She rushes to the hospital to be told that her son has died. After hearing that Kush may still leave for Dubai, she feels helpless and tries to commit suicide by opioid overdose but she is then strengthened by the discovery of Shakil's watch. She attends Shakil's memorial in the Albert Square gardens and makes amends with Karen Taylor (Lorraine Stanley). Shakil's best friend, Keegan Baker (Zack Morris) takes her to where Shakil's killer, Bruno (Josh Fraser), lives and offers to square things but Carmel warns him against this and they have the police arrest Bruno; outside the police station, Carmel reveals herself to his mother, Sophie (Melanie Harris). When Carmel finds Keegan in possession of a knife, she anonymously hands it in and decides to campaign for a knife amnesty, where young people can hand in knives to a public knife bin and their identities remain secret. She then tries to start a youth club but fails. At Halloween, Keegan stabs a boy who disrespected Shakil and Carmel allows him to think that the boy died, Carmel and Karen have a heated argument leading to Keegan finally seeing sense. Carmel and Keegan make amends before she moves abroad.

In April 2021, Carmel discovers off-screen that Kush has died after being struck by a train. She is devastated to hear this and phones Martin to say that she will not be returning to Walford as it contains too many bad memories and would like Kush's body to be moved to her in Dubai.

Langford was nominated for the "Best Newcomer" award at The Inside Soap Awards 2015 for her portrayal of Carmel. She also won the "Best Newcomer" award at The British Soap Awards in 2016 for her portrayal of Carmel. In September 2016, Laura-Jane Tyler of Inside Soap described Carmel as the "life and soul of Walford" amid a time for the show when it was "on a low gas". In July 2018, Langford was longlisted for the "Best Actress" accolade at The Inside Soap Awards. She progressed to the viewer-voted shortlist in October 2018.

Paul Coker

Paul Coker, played by Jonny Labey, made his first screen appearance on 1 June 2015. He is the grandson of Les Coker (Roger Sloman) and Pam Coker (Lin Blakley) and has a relationship with Ben Mitchell (Harry Reid). 
Labey was nominated, alongside Reid, for Best Affair at the Inside Soap Awards in 2015 for their portrayal of Paul and Ben's affair. On 19 April 2016, it was announced that Labey would be leaving the show, and Paul was killed-off on 19 July 2016 as part of a homophobia storyline.

Jade Green

Jade Green, played by Amaya Edward, is the daughter of Shabnam Masood (Rakhee Thakrar) and Dean Wicks (Matt Di Angelo). She first appears on 12 June 2015. She was conceived during a one-night stand in 2008 and Shabnam named her Roya and gave her up for adoption. However, she was fostered, not adopted and Dean's mother, Shirley Carter (Linda Henry), tracks Jade down after being given her address by Shabnam's father, Masood Ahmed (Nitin Ganatra).

Shabnam decides she wants to be part of Jade's life, following the death of her son, Zaair Kazemi. Shabnam and her husband, Kush Kazemi (Davood Ghadami) go into a custody battle with Jade's grandparents, Shirley and her boyfriend Buster Briggs (Karl Howman). However, Shabnam decides she is not ready to raise Jade as she is still grieving for Zaair and is persuaded not to go for custody. Shirley and Buster gain custody of Jade, but after Dean is arrested for attempted rape, they give full custody to Shabnam and she and Jade leave together for a fresh start on 5 February 2016.

In 2017, Jade's uncle Mick Carter (Danny Dyer) send her an invitation for his wife Linda Carter's (Kellie Bright) 40th birthday, but Shirley told him that Jade and Shabnam cannot make it due to flight conflicts.

Following Jade's first appearance, in which Shirley sees her using a nebuliser, it was confirmed that EastEnders were pursuing a cystic fibrosis storyline, with the Cystic Fibrosis Trust confirming they were working with producers on the storyline. Oli Lewington, Engagement Director at the Trust, said that the organisation was "delighted that an often unseen condition like cystic fibrosis is finally getting the national recognition it deserves, and we're hugely grateful to the EastEnders team for helping to make it happen."

Rosemary Kerr
 
Dr Rosemary Kerr, played by Jessica Guise, appears in two episodes on 26 June and 8 October 2015. She treats Shabnam Masood (Rakhee Thakrar) in hospital after she is assaulted by a gang. She informs Shabnam that she is pregnant. She later treats Ian Beale (Adam Woodyatt) after he is hit by a car.

Viewers took to Twitter saying that she looks like Ian's deceased daughter Lucy Beale (Hetti Bywater).

Gavin Sullivan

Gavin Sullivan, played by Paul Nicholas, is the husband of established character Kathy Sullivan (Gillian Taylforth) and biological father of Sharon Mitchell (Letitia Dean). Gavin is first mentioned by name only as Kathy's husband after Kathy's departure in 2000. He and Kathy are supposed to have died in a car accident off-screen in 2006. The couple are revealed to be alive in February 2015, Gavin making his first screen appearance on 21 August 2015. He reveals he is Sharon's father in October 2015. Gavin made an unannounced departure on 8 July 2016.

Hazel Warren
 
Hazel Warren, played by Clare Higgins, appears in nine episodes from 15 to 29 September 2015 (episodes 5138 to 5146) as the prosecution lawyer in Max Branning's (Jake Wood) trial for the murder of Lucy Beale (Hetti Bywater) (see "Who Killed Lucy Beale?"). Hazel is successful with her prosecution of Max and he is found guilty of Lucy's murder and sentenced to life imprisonment. Of her involvement in the show, Higgins said, "I had such a great time at EastEnders. It was a privilege to be part of such an exciting storyline and work with such a fantastic group of actors."

Louie Beale

Louie Beale, played by Oscar Winehouse, first appears in the episode broadcast on 17 September 2015. He is the son of Peter Beale (Ben Hardy) and Lauren Branning (Jacqueline Jossa). In September 2017, Jossa and Lorna Fitzgerald's departures were announced and Louie left alongside Lauren on 16 February 2018.

Lauren returns to Walford when she discovers her father Max Branning (Jake Wood) is to stand trial for Peter's twin sister Lucy Beale's (Hetti Bywater) murder (see Who Killed Lucy Beale?). However, before she can clear Max's name she goes into labour and she gives birth to her son in September 2015, whom she names Louie, after Peter's late great-grandmother Lou Beale (Anna Wing). Max is convicted of Lucy's murder in October 2015 so Lauren returns to New Zealand with Louie. They return to Walford in May 2016 with Peter's older half-brother Steven Beale (Aaron Sidwell), who is now in a relationship with Lauren. Lauren and Steven's relationship begins to fall apart, with Lauren growing closer to her employer, Josh Hemmings (Eddie Eyre). Lauren decides to take Louie and return to New Zealand, but she changes her mind when Steven pretends he has a brain tumour in mid 2017. Steven asks Lauren if he can adopt Louie and sees a solicitor about obtaining parental responsibility of Louie. In September 2017, Steven dies from injuries caused by Max in a fire, and Lauren starts a relationship with Josh. Lauren and Josh plan to move to Glasgow but on Christmas Day 2017, Lauren and her sister Abi Branning (Lorna Fitzgerald) fall from a roof, Lauren breaks her pelvis and needs surgery however Abi dies. After Abi's funeral, Lauren and Louie leave to and live in New Zealand for a fresh start.

Sami Jackson

Sami Jackson first appears in the episode broadcast on 22 September 2015. He is the son of Robbie Jackson (Dean Gaffney) and Nita Mistry (Bindya Solanki).

Robbie returns to Walford in 2010 to attend his sister Bianca Jackson's (Patsy Palmer) wedding to Ricky Butcher (Sid Owen) and reveals to the family that Nita is six months pregnant. Robbie returns to Mumbai after the wedding where Nita later gives birth to Sami.

Following Robbie and Nita's separation in 2015, Robbie and Sami arrives in Walford and Robbie meets with his mother Carol Jackson (Lindsey Coulson), his half-sister Sonia Jackson (Natalie Cassidy), and his niece Bex Fowler (Jasmine Armfield) and introduces them all to Sami. Carol, Robbie and Sami move to Milton Keynes near the rest of Robbie's family.

However, when Robbie returns in 2017, Sami is living with Nita in India but mentions them on occasion.

In 2019, Robbie goes to India to see Nita and Sami and brings him back to Walford for a visit. When Nita phones for Robbie to return Sami, he ignores her phone calls. Robbie's flatmate Kush Kazemi (Davood Ghadami) notices the missed calls and tries to persuade Robbie to do the right thing but to no avail. Nita arrives in Walford and Robbie barricades himself and Sami inside the flat. Nita threatens to call the police but Sonia persuades her not to. Robbie eventually unlocks the door and returns Sami to Nita and allows Robbie to say goodbye to Sami before they leave for India. Several months later, Sami is injured in an accident and Robbie flies to India to see him.

Wellard II

Wellard II (or Wellard 2), played by Panther, is a Belgian Tervuren who Robbie Jackson (Dean Gaffney) gets for his young son, Sami Jackson, as Robbie never got over the death of the original Wellard. Wellard II made his first appearance in September 2015 during Robbie's guest return. Speaking of Wellard II, Gaffney said "Robbie and Wellard were inseparable, so it only seems right that there will be a Wellard 2. I think viewers are going to love him!" In an interview with Good Morning Britain, Gaffney revealed that Panther is the same breed as the dog who played the original Wellard, and said he is from the same family, possibly the grandson.

When Robbie returns to Walford in 2015, he intends to get a dog and name it after Wellard. On the day that Robbie and Sami are due to leave, they are disappointed when some puppies were sold, but Carol surprises them with a dog. Sami asks what he is called and Robbie reveals his name, Wellard II.
 
When Robbie returns in 2017 and has to live with Dot Branning (June Brown), she has doubts due to the dog but Sonia Fowler (Natalie Cassidy) says that Robbie has lost the dog but does not say if this means Wellard II has died, if he ran away or if he is living with Sami.

Jason Adams

Jason Adams, played by Scott Neal, is the toyboy lover of Elaine Peacock (Maria Friedman). The character was confirmed on 3 September 2015 when executive producer Dominic Treadwell-Collins teased an upcoming storyline, saying "We've got some rare fun for the Carters as Maria Friedman returns for a three-month stint with Scott Neal in tow as her toy boy lover. All of which will add a little bit of fun for Mick (Danny Dyer) and Linda (Kellie Bright) in the pub." A show insider said "The Carters are shocked when Elaine returns home from holiday with Jase. He's certainly put a smile on her face, but is he all that he seems?"

Jason arrives with Elaine at The Queen Victoria pub, surprising her daughter Linda and her family, when Elaine announces that she and Jason are engaged. Mick's great-aunt, Babe Smith (Annette Badland), and Linda initially are cautious about trusting Jason. Linda's distrust of him grows when she catches Babe having a passionate encounter with Jason in the kitchen. Linda asks Babe to get Jason to leave or she will tell Elaine. When Elaine jokes about Jason having a crush on Babe, Babe snaps and tells her the truth, but Elaine does not believe this and accuses her of being jealous. When Babe tells Jason that Linda wants him to leave, he says he really likes her. Realising Babe has money, he says he wants to move away with her, but when she says it will take time to get the money, he suggests that they steal from the pub. Babe secretly records this and plays the recording in front of him, Elaine and everyone in the pub. Elaine then slaps Babe and Mick orders Jason to leave. After Babe explains herself to Elaine and Linda, Jason arrives for his belongings, leaving the three women shocked as to how remorseless he is for hurting the family, so Linda throws him out and sends his belongings to charity.

Kyle Slater

Kyle Slater, played by Riley Carter Millington, is Stacey Branning's (Lacey Turner) half-brother. He made his first appearance on 30 October 2015 and left on 25 November 2016.

Kyle first arrives in Walford on Halloween and is seen by Stacey watching her from afar. She sees him throughout the day, and he briefly goes to her party that night, though he leaves shortly afterwards, revealing (to the audience) that he has a key around his neck similar to one that Stacey previously had but that was taken by her mother, Jean Slater (Gillian Wright). Kyle later attends a church service that Stacey is also at, and he sits behind her while she prays. When Kyle gets up to leave, Stacey shouts after him, asking if she knows him, and later tells her boyfriend Martin Fowler (James Bye) that she is being stalked. When Jean visits Stacey, Stacey tells her about her stalker. Jean's husband, Ollie Walters (Tony O'Callaghan), says someone visited Jean recently, and Jean eventually reveals that Stacey's father Brian had another family, and Stacey realises that Kyle is her half brother. In the new year, Kyle resolves to introduce him to Stacey, so he returns to Walford, supported by his friends Sophie Dodd (Poppy Rush) and Ricksy Hicks (Joel Phillimore). He tells Stacey he is her brother, and she is upset when he talks about his memories of their father. Kyle mentions his sisters, Siobhan and Shannon, and hands Stacey envelopes for her and her brother Sean Slater (Rob Kazinsky) that Kyle found in Brian's safety deposit box that the key opened. Stacey notes that Kyle is the only one of Brian's children whose name does not start with the letter S. They agree to stay in touch, and Kyle tells Sophie that he does not want Stacey to know his secret. After Stacey runs away from the square with her son Arthur and hides in the allotments, she calls Kyle, saying he is the only person she can trust. Kyle takes her to a café, and while she is changing Arthur's nappy, Kyle calls Martin from her phone, who calls him a fraud, after hearing from Charlie Slater (Derek Martin) that Brian only had daughters with his other wife, including one named Sarah. Stacey takes the phone from Kyle and Martin tells her that Kyle is not her brother, so Stacey accuses him of being the devil before running away. Martin and Kush Kazemi (Davood Ghadami) arrive shortly afterwards, and warn Kyle not to follow them. He later returns during Charlie's funeral, where Stacey freaks out upon seeing him and flees with Arthur.

Kyle returns a month later and gives Martin a box from Brian's safety deposit box for Stacey. Martin tells Kyle that Stacey has been sectioned and blames him for this, and Martin warns him away from Walford. When Stacey has a home visit, Kyle returns but Stacey tells him to leave and tells Martin to throw the box away. When Kyle finds her later, she calls him a liar as Brian only had three daughters with his other wife, so Kyle says he used to be Stacey's sister Sarah, and he is transgender. Stacey accepts this and allows Kyle to move into her home. When Stacey is discharged from hospital, she arranges a family lunch with Kyle, Martin, Jean, Ollie and her cousin Belinda Peacock (Carli Norris). Jean refuses to believe Kyle is Stacey's brother, so he is forced to reveal that he is transgender, but Jean still does not believe him. Kyle later gets a job at Ian Beale's (Adam Woodyatt) restaurant as a chef.

Kyle later embarks on a brief feud with newcomer Andy Flynn (Jack Derges) when Andy seems to be trying it on with Stacey, despite her being engaged to Martin. Kyle's suspicions result in him trying to shake Andy off of his ladder. When Stacey reminds him that that is how their father died, Kyle cools the feud. Kyle is later disappointed when the residents start to realise that he is transgender but they are accepting of this. When Stacey realises that Kyle's mother, Alison Slater (Denise Welch) has never seen him as a man, she arranges for her to meet Kyle. Alison meets Kyle but cannot bring herself to accept Kyle as a man. This upsets Kyle. A few weeks later, Stacey and Martin get married, much to Kyle's delight.

Kyle later realises that the burglary that took place at the restaurant was actually down to Ian's adopted son, Steven Beale (Aaron Sidwell). However, he agrees not to tell anyone after Steven sends him on a course. When Martin's teenage daughter, Bex Fowler (Jasmine Armfield), moves in with the Fowlers, Kyle attempts to ask Steven for a pay rise but he does not agree. Following the course, Kyle is featured in a magazine, and the person who ran the course contacts him to offer him a job in France. Kyle wants to take the job but does not want to leave Stacey and Martin short of money. However, Stacey, Martin and Ian all encourage him to follow his dreams. After Alison phones him and calls him Kyle for the first time, his confidence is boosted, so he accepts the job. After cooking a final meal for his family, Kyle leaves.

Development and reception
It was announced in March 2015 that the show was planning to cast a transgender actor to play a transgender character. Following this announcement, a number of transgender actors put themselves forward for the role, and EastEnders producers undertook workshops and worked alongside groups within the transgender community.

The character and casting was confirmed on 8 October 2015. Of his casting, Millington said, "I am extremely excited to be joining EastEnders. I can honestly say that I have now fulfilled my two biggest dreams—to be living my life as a man and to be an actor. I cannot wait to really get stuck in with filming and I look forward to seeing what is in store for my character." Executive producer Dominic Treadwell-Collins confirmed it had been his intention to cast a trans actor in a trans role, saying, "we have been so careful to ensure that we cast the right actor for the part", and said, "In Riley, we have found not just a talented actor but also an inspirational young man whose warmth immediately comes through the screen. And this isn't about tokenism. Alex Lamb and his story team have worked with Riley to create an EastEnders character who is fresh and relatable—but also comes with his own stock of secrets and is going to be thrown right into one of our biggest stories for the end of the year. I hope that the audience will take Riley and his character to their hearts as quickly as everyone here at EastEnders has done." This was reported as the first time a transgender actor has played the role of a transgender character in a British soap opera, though Annie Wallace was cast at around the same time in Hollyoaks as Sally St. Claire, while transgender actress Rebecca Root had a minor role in Hollyoaks earlier in 2015.

In September 2016, Millington was announced as one of several cast members that had been axed by new executive producer, Sean O'Connor. Of his departure, Millington stated: "When I landed a 6 month contract at EastEnders, it was a dream come true. For that to be extended to a year was something that I never expected. However, as the time comes for Kyle to depart Walford I am looking forward to taking on new roles and who knows, Kyle may find his way back to Walford one day."

Kyle's arrival in the show was nominated for the "media moment" award at the 2016 British LGBT Awards.

Arthur Fowler

Arthur Brian Fowler is the son of Stacey Branning (Lacey Turner) and Kush Kazemi (Davood Ghadami), and the stepson of Martin Fowler (James Bye). His first appearance is in the episode broadcast on 24 December 2015, in which his birth is depicted. It was revealed in a behind the scenes documentary, Stacey Branning – On the Edge, that 16 babies were licensed to play Arthur for filming of Stacey's illness storyline, due to legal boundaries. From 2016 until 2022, Arthur was played by Hunter Bell. The character of Arthur is currently being portrayed by Rocco Brenner his first scenes aired on 21 March 2022. 

Arthur is the result of a one-night stand between Stacey and Kush, before she starts dating Martin, and while Kush is on a break from his relationship with Shabnam Masood (Rakhee Thakrar). When Stacey finds out that she is pregnant, she tells Martin that he is the father but hides her baby scans from him. She later admits to her best friend, Shabnam, that Martin is not the father. On Shabnam and Kush's wedding day, Kush confronts Stacey and she tells him that she believes he could be the father. Arthur is born at Stacey's daughter, Lily Branning's (Aine Garvey) nativity play.

Martin names the baby after his father, Arthur Fowler (Bill Treacher), and Stacey's father, Brian Slater. After noticing how Kush is with Arthur, Shabnam asks Stacey if he is the father, but Stacey denies this. Stacey starts to fear for Arthur's safety, believing him to be the son of God, and climbs onto the roof of The Queen Victoria public house with Arthur, where she believes they are closer to God. Martin talks her down and she is hospitalised and diagnosed with postpartum psychosis. Arthur is left in Martin's care, though he regularly takes him to visit her. Due to stress of looking after Arthur and Lily and trying to find Stacey a place at a mother and baby unit, Martin crashes his van with Arthur in the vehicle. Arthur is unharmed. Martin finds a mother and baby unit, so Arthur moves in there to be with Stacey. Martin discovers that Kush is Arthur's father from a letter Stacey wrote, so leaves for America. When he returns, he publicly reveals that Kush is Arthur's father. During a home visit, Stacey tells Kush he can be involved in Arthur's life, but Kush realises he is a bad role model and decides that Arthur is better off without him.

Stacey and Martin decide to keep their distance from the Kazemis following Arthur's stepsister, Bex Fowler (Jasmine Armfield), being bullied. Arthur's grandmother, Carmel Kazemi (Bonnie Langford), is hurt with being excluded from Arthur's life and Stacey and Carmel fight when Carmel makes remarks about Stacey's mental health. However, Max Branning (Jake Wood), Stacey's former father-in-law, persuades Stacey to let Carmel be involved with Arthur. Stacey allows Kush to look after Arthur, and Martin and Kush make up with each other. Kush is delighted when Martin tells him that he can look after Arthur for a night each week. When Kush suffers a cardiac arrest, he is diagnosed with Brugada Syndrome, which is hereditary. Stacey worries that Arthur could die and tells Bex about the possibility of Arthur having the syndrome. A doctor assures Stacey that the chance of Arthur displaying symptoms at a young age is small. Arthur undergoes an ECG and Stacey, Kush and Martin are told by the specialist that Arthur is at high risk at having the condition, but cannot have an operation or tests like Kush due to his age. Stacey is anxious that Arthur having a cardiac arrest is a sign of the condition and his parents are told about equipment that is not available on the NHS. Stacey is angry with Martin that he asked Kush for money to buy the equipment. Stacey and Martin panic when Arthur will not wake up, and when they receive Arthur's medical records at the hospital, Stacey and Martin are told that Arthur has swallowed Stacey's bipolar medication. Carmel is horrified when she finds bruises on Arthur's arms, and expresses her concerns to Kush that Stacey is unwell, while Stacey tells Michelle Fowler (Jenna Russell) that he gained the bruises in hospital. However, Lily tells Carmel that Stacey was responsible, so Carmel reports it to social services, but tries to retract what she said after realising it was a mistake. Social services visit Stacey and Martin and tell them they received a report about Arthur. Arthur and Lily are placed in Carmel's care until social services have investigated. Arthur is looked over by a doctor, who has no concerns and Stacey and Martin can have Arthur and Lily back. Social worker Fiona Payne (Sandra James-Young) tells Stacey and Martin she will be conducting further home visits.

After Stacey cheats on Martin with Max, Stacey leaves Walford with Arthur, Lily and his half-sister, Hope Fowler. Stacey returns a few weeks later and when Stacey is out, Martin accuses her of being with Max, so Stacey decides Martin should leave; he is hurt Stacey does not regard Arthur and Lily as his children, but he angrily throws her out and exposes her affair. Martin keeps the children inside, away from Stacey, though the pair support each other briefly when Lily holds Hope by the upstairs window, asking for Stacey. Martin rejects Stacey when she says the children need her and he decides he will not let Stacey near the children. Martin decides to go for custody and when Kush and Carmel find out, Carmel wants Kush to get custody of Arthur, but Kush attempts to get them to resolve their problems. Martin sees Stacey, offering her contact, but Stacey contacts Lily's father, Ryan Malloy (Neil McDermott), to help her and a locksmith changes the locks, devastating Martin. An unknown relative of Arthur's, Hayley Slater (Katie Jarvis), distracts Martin when he is looking after Hope and after finding out who she is, Stacey contacts Hayley again and when Martin is looking after Hope and Arthur, Hayley encourages Martin to take the children to a stay and play, buy them some tea and eat ice cream, disobeying Stacey's instructions. Hayley pretends to defend Martin in front of Stacey when she collects Arthur and Hope with police presence due to Martin not returning them.

Other characters

References

External links

2015
EastEnders
2015 in British television